Shafqat is a given name. Notable people with the name include:

Shafqat Amanat Ali PP (born 1965), Pakistani pop and classical singer, songwriter, composer
Shafqat Cheema, Pakistani actor and producer
Pir Shafqat Hussain Shah Jilani (born 1949), Pakistani politician, member of the National Assembly of Pakistan
Sardar Shafqat Hayat Khan, Pakistani politician, member of the National Assembly of Pakistan
Shafqat Ali Khan (born 1972), Pakistani classical singer of the khyal vocal genre
Shafqat Mahmood (born 1950), Pakistani bureaucrat-turned-politician
Shafqat Mahmood (politician), Pakistani politician, Member of the Provincial Assembly of the Punjab
Muhammad Shafqat Malik (born 1970), Pakistani field hockey player
Shafqat Tanvir Mirza (1932–2012), Pakistani writer and a journalist
Shafqat Rana (born 1943), former Pakistani cricketer
Shafqat Rasool (born 1988), Pakistani field hockey player
Mahmood Shafqat, Pakistani diplomat
Masood Shafqat, Pakistani politician, Member of the Provincial Assembly of the Punjab
Suleman Shafqat (born 2001), Pakistani cricketer

See also
Shafqat Emmanuel and Shagufta Kausar blasphemy case, Pakistani Christian couple convicted of blasphemy with a sentence of death by hanging
Shavkat
Shivgad